Christopher Bowen (born 1959) is a British actor. 

Christopher Bowen may also refer to:

 Christopher C. Bowen (1832–1880), American politician from South Carolina
 Chris Bowen (born 1973), Australian politician

See also
 Bowen (surname)